Ra'Shon Lamar "Sunny" Harris (born August 26, 1986) is a former American football defensive end. He was drafted by the Steelers in the sixth round of the 2009 NFL Draft. He played college football at Oregon.

Harris also played for the Buffalo Bills, Pittsburgh Steelers, Carolina Panthers, and Houston Texans.

Early years
Harris was rated among the top 50 prep prospects in California by SuperPrep magazine as well as one of the best 11 defensive linemen in the state. He was a Two-time All-Bay Valley League defender and a Two-time All-area honoree (Contra Costa Times) and Tacoma News Tribune Western 100 pick. As a senior, he led the league in quarterback sacks (5), in addition to forcing one fumble and recovering another and completed his prep career with 15 quarterback sacks.

College years
In 2008, he was a first-year starter at the University of Oregon and finished year as team's 10th-leading tackler with 47 and tops among interior linemen in tackles for lost with 9. He also had three sacks. He shared team's top bench press pinnacle (415 lbs.) regardless of position in addition to equaling best power clean mark (341 lbs.) among team's defensive linemen. In 2007, he played in 12 of 13 games and made 15 tackles with three for a loss. In 2006, he was expected to vie for opportunity to provide a major contribution before a torn triceps muscle during fall camp was thought to end the year before it started. He was able to return for the final six games of the season Harris was credited with a single-game high two tackles against Portland State in season debut, and logged one quarterback sack for a 10-yard loss vs. Washington. In 2005, he played all 12 games, recording no tackles and was named scout team's defensive player of the week for aiding preparations vs. Washington. The previous season, 2004, he was recognized as scout team's defensive player of the week for aiding preparations heading into UCLA game.

Professional career

Pre-draft

First stint with Steelers
Harris was drafted by the Pittsburgh Steelers in the sixth round of the 2009 NFL Draft. He was waived during final cuts on September 4.

Carolina Panthers
Harris was claimed off waivers by the Carolina Panthers on September 6, 2009. He made his regular season debut against the Atlanta Falcons, recording one assisted tackle. After playing two games for the Panthers, the team waived Harris on October 1 to make room for veteran defensive tackle Hollis Thomas. The Panthers re-signed Harris to the practice squad on October 3.

Second stint with Steelers
Harris was signed off the Panthers practice squad on October 14, 2009 by the Pittsburgh Steelers, the team that drafted him. Harris replaced Aaron Smith, who went on injured reserve. He was waived on September 4, 2010.

Buffalo Bills
Harris was claimed off waivers by the Buffalo Bills on October 6, 2010 and placed on their practice squad.

Third stint with Steelers
The Steelers signed Harris to their practice squad on November 3, 2010 after defensive end Al Woods was signed off their practice squad by the Tampa Bay Buccaneers.

References

External links
Carolina Panthers bio
Oregon Ducks bio

1986 births
Living people
African-American players of American football
American football defensive ends
American football defensive tackles
Buffalo Bills players
Carolina Panthers players
Edmonton Elks players
Oregon Ducks football players
People from Pittsburg, California
Pittsburgh Steelers players
Players of American football from California
Sportspeople from the San Francisco Bay Area
21st-century African-American sportspeople
20th-century African-American people